The  is a rapid transit line in Tokyo and Chiba Prefecture, Japan, operated by Tokyo Metropolitan Bureau of Transportation (Toei). The line runs between Motoyawata Station in Ichikawa, Chiba in the east and Shinjuku Station in the west. At Shinjuku, most trains continue as through services to Sasazuka Station on the Keiō New Line, with some services continuing to Hashimoto Station in Sagamihara, Kanagawa via the Keiō Line and the Keiō Sagamihara Line.

On maps and signboards, the line is shown in the color leaf green. Stations carry the letter "S" followed by a two-digit number inside a yellow-green chartreuse circle.

Basic data
Double-tracking: Entire line
Railway signalling: D-ATC

Overview

According to the Tokyo Metropolitan Bureau of Transportation, as of June 2009 the Shinjuku Line was the third most crowded subway line in Tokyo, at its peak running at 181% capacity between Nishi-ōjima and Sumiyoshi stations.

Station list
 Express trains stop at stations marked with a circle (●), while local trains make all stops.
 Express trains run between Motoyawata Station and Hashimoto Station on the Keiō Sagamihara Line via the Keio Main Line and Keio New Line.
 On weekends and holidays, two trains run through to Takaosanguchi Station on the Keiō Takao Line and one runs through to Tama-Dōbutsukōen Station on the Keiō Dōbutsuen Line.

Rolling stock
The Toei Shinjuku Line is served by the following types of 8-car and 10-car EMUs.

Current
 Toei 10-300 series
 Keio 5000 series
 Keio 9000 series

Former
 Toei 10-300R series (until 2017)
 Toei 10-000 series (until 2018)
 Keio 6000 series (until 2011)

History

 21 December 1978: Iwamotochō – Higashi-ōjima section opens.
 16 March 1980: Shinjuku – Iwamotochō section opens; through service onto Keiō lines begins.
 23 December 1983: Higashi-ōjima – Funabori section opens.
 14 September 1986: Funabori – Shinozaki section opens.
 19 March 1989: Shinozaki – Motoyawata section opens, entire line completed.

Notes 

a. Crowding levels defined by the Ministry of Land, Infrastructure, Transport and Tourism:

100% — Commuters have enough personal space and are able to take a seat or stand while holding onto the straps or hand rails.
150% — Commuters have enough personal space to read a newspaper.
180% — Commuters must fold newspapers to read.
200% — Commuters are pressed against each other in each compartment but can still read small magazines.
250% — Commuters are pressed against each other, unable to move.

References

External links

 Bureau of Transportation, Tokyo Metropolitan Government 

 
Toei Subway
Railway lines in Tokyo
Railway lines in Chiba Prefecture
4 ft 6 in gauge railways in Japan
Railway lines opened in 1978
1978 establishments in Japan